Saints Severinus of Sanseverino (or of Septempeda) (d. 550 AD) and Victorinus of Camerino (d. 543 AD) were brothers who were both bishops and hermits of the 6th century.

Biography
According to an unreliable legend, the brothers were noblemen who had given away their great wealth to the poor and had become hermits at Monte Nero near Septempeda.  

Victorinus then withdrew to a cave near Pioraco.  Victorinus was prone to strong temptations, and he inflicted upon himself a difficult and painful penance: he had himself tied to a tree, with his hands clasped between two branches.  Victorinus’ particular method of self-mortification was depicted on a small panel in the church of San Venanzio, in Camerino, by the artist Niccolò da Foligno (called l'Alunno), who created the piece between 1478–80.

However, in 540 Pope Vigilius appointed them each as bishops of two separate sees: Severinus became bishop of what was then called Septempeda, later called San Severino Marche after him, in the Marches of Ancona; Victorinus became bishop of Camerino.

Severinus died in 545. His remains were hidden in the Cathedral of St. Maria in Septempeda to protect them from looting; found in 590 during the restoration of the cathedral, they were brought to Monte Nero.

Veneration
There is a church dedicated to San Vittorino in Pioraco.
Their joint feast day is June 8.

Notes

Italian saints
Bishops in le Marche
Italian hermits
543 deaths
550 deaths
Sibling duos
Saints duos
6th-century Christian saints
Year of birth unknown
6th-century Italian bishops